Aislinn Meaney (born 24 October 1998) is an Irish association footballer, who plays for Treaty United. She has previously played for Galway W.F.C. and the American Akron Zips women's soccer team. She has played for the Republic of Ireland women's national football team.

Personal life
Meaney is from Ennis. As a youngster, she played Ladies' Gaelic football for Clare U14, with whom she won the 2012 All-Ireland title for her age group. She studied arts at NUI Galway, and played for their varsity team from 2017 until 2019. In 2019, she transferred her studies to the University of Akron in the US.

Club career
As a youngster, Meaney played for Lifford Ladies, making her senior debut at the age of 16. In 2017, she joined Galway. Meaney was the 2018 Women's National League Player of the Month for May 2018, and was named in the league's Team of the Season. She was on the shortlist for the Player of the Season award.

In 2019, Meaney signed for American Akron Zips women's soccer team; Meaney and Lucia Lobato were the first Irishwomen to play for the Zips. She made 19 appearances in her first season at the club. During the COVID-19 pandemic, she was unable to play in the US and returned to Ireland. Ahead of the 2021 Women's National League, Meaney left Galway. She played for Akron Zips in 2021, and later returned to Galway in June 2021. In 2022, Meaney joined Treaty United.

International career
Meaney played for Republic of Ireland women's national under-17 football team, and was part of the Irish under-17 team that beat England 2–0 in a 2015 UEFA Women's Under-17 Championship qualification match. She made four appearances in that qualification tournament, and was also in the Republic of Ireland squad for the 2015 UEFA Women's Under-17 Championship in Iceland.

Meaney made her debut for the senior side in a 2018 friendly match against Portugal. She also played in a 2018 match against Poland. As of 2019, she had made two appearances for the senior team. She also played for the Irish Universities Team in the women's football tournament at the 2019 Summer Universiade; they finished fourth in the tournament.

References

External links

Republic of Ireland women's international footballers
1998 births
Living people
Women's National League (Ireland) players
Alumni of the University of Galway
University of Akron alumni
Sportspeople from County Clare
People from Ennis
Competitors at the 2019 Summer Universiade
Galway W.F.C. players
Akron Zips women's soccer players
Republic of Ireland women's association footballers
Women's association football midfielders
Women's association football forwards
Republic of Ireland women's youth international footballers